Whiteknight may refer to:

 White knight
 17612 Whiteknight, a minor planet

See also
Black knight (disambiguation)
White horse (disambiguation)
White night (disambiguation)